Diego Sinhué Rodríguez Vallejo (born 15 November 1980) is a Mexican politician affiliated with the National Action Party (PAN) who is currently the governor of Guanajuato. He previously represented his state as a federal deputy in the LXII Legislature of the Mexican Congress.

Life
He became a PAN member in 2005, sitting on its municipal youth committee and becoming the head of training in the state's third district. In 2006, he was elected as a regidor on León's city council, and in 2010, he was elected to the Guanajuato state congress, serving two years and presiding over the Urban Development and Public Works Commission.

In 2012, voters in Guanajuato's fifth federal electoral district, which includes portions of León, sent Sinhué to the Chamber of Deputies for the LXII Legislature of the Mexican Congress. He was a secretary on the Budget and Public Account Commission and also sat on those dealing with Foreign Relations and Housing; during this time, he obtained a master's degree in public administration from the Universidad de Guanajuato. On February 17, 2015, Sinhué permanently took leave from the Chamber of Deputies and was tapped by Governor Miguel Márquez Márquez to become the Guanajuato state secretary of social and human development. He left the post on July 31, 2017, announcing his intention to run for the PAN nomination for Governor of Guanajuato.

In the 2018 Guanajuato gubernatorial campaign, Sinhué was nominated by the Por Guanajuato al Frente coalition, consisting of the PAN, PRD and Movimiento Ciudadano; he was the only PAN candidate. Exit polls on election night showed Sinhué with a double-digit lead over Ricardo Sheffield, who ran as the Juntos Haremos Historia candidate.

References

1980 births
Living people
Politicians from Guanajuato
People from León, Guanajuato
Members of the Chamber of Deputies (Mexico) for Guanajuato
National Action Party (Mexico) politicians
21st-century Mexican politicians
Governors of Guanajuato
Deputies of the LXII Legislature of Mexico